The Silver Retirement Medallion is awarded by the Central Intelligence Agency for a career of 25, but less than 35, years or more with the Agency.

See also 
Awards and decorations of the United States government

References

Retirement medallions of the Central Intelligence Agency